Joseph James Paparella (March 9, 1909 – October 17, 1994) was a professional baseball umpire who worked in the American League from 1946 to 1965. Paparella umpired 3,142 major league games in his 20-year career. He umpired in four World Series (1948, 1951, 1957 and 1963) and four All-Star Games (1948, 1954, 1959 and 1964).

References

External links

The Sporting News umpire card
Joe Paparella Oral History Interview (1 of 3) - National Baseball Hall of Fame Digital Collection
Joe Paparella Oral History Interview (2 of 3) - National Baseball Hall of Fame Digital Collection
Joe Paparella Oral History Interview (3 of 3) - National Baseball Hall of Fame Digital Collection

1909 births
1994 deaths
Major League Baseball umpires
People from Lackawanna County, Pennsylvania
Sportspeople from Pennsylvania
People from Sebastian, Florida